Petřiny is a station on the Prague Metro. It is one of four stations opened on 6 April 2015 as part of a project to extend Line A, together with Bořislavka, Nádraží Veleslavín and Nemocnice Motol.

General information
Petřiny station is located under Brunclíkova street in Břevnov, Prague 6, next to the Petřiny housing estate, with a connection to a tram and bus stop and the shopping centre and a K+R at Na Petřinách street. In 5 minutes by walk, quite near, there's also Gymnázium nad Alejí, ZŠ Petřiny jih and ZŠ Petřiny sever schools.

The station's tunnel is the largest underground construction on the Prague Metro, at 217m long, 16m high and 22m wide, located 40m below the surface. The station was designed by architect Jiří Pešata.

Gallery

References

Prague Metro stations
Railway stations opened in 2015
2015 establishments in the Czech Republic
Prague 6
Railway stations in the Czech Republic opened in the 21st century